Kim Donaldson (born August 24, 1983) is a Canadian rugby union player. She represented  at the 2010 and 2014 Women's Rugby World Cup.

Donaldson has a Bachelor's degree in Anthropology from the University of British Columbia.

References

External links
 Player profile at Rugby Canada 

1983 births
Living people
Canadian female rugby union players
Canada women's international rugby union players
University of British Columbia alumni